Morinda is a genus of flowering plants in the madder family, Rubiaceae. The generic name is derived from the Latin words morus "mulberry", from the appearance of the fruits, and indica, meaning "of India".

Description
Distributed in all tropical regions of the world, Morinda includes 80 species of trees, shrubs or vines. All Morinda species bear aggregate or multiple fruits that can be fleshy (like Morinda citrifolia) or dry. Most species of this genus originate in the area of Borneo, New Guinea, Northern Australia and New Caledonia.

In traditional Japanese, Korean and Chinese medicine, Morinda citrifolia is considered to be a herb with biological properties, although there is no confirmed evidence of clinical efficacy.

Fossil record
The first fossil record for genus Morinda is from fruit of Morinda chinensis found in coal dated from the Eocene  in the Changchang Basin of Hainan Island, South China.

Selected species

Plants in the former genus Appunettia are now considered synonymous with Morinda.

Formerly placed here
Psychotria muscosa (Jacq.) Steyerm. (as Morinda muscosa Jacq.)

References

External links
 World Checklist of Rubiaceae

 
Rubiaceae genera